"Sweet Dreams (Ola Ola E)" is a song recorded by German Eurodance duo La Bouche. It was originally released in March 1994 as the lead single from their debut album of the same name (1995). In North America, the song was released in November 1995. It was successful on the charts, reaching number-one in both Italy and on the Canadian RPM Dance/Urban chart, and peaking at number 17 on the Eurochart Hot 100. In the United States, the song reached number 13 on the Billboard Hot 100 and number eight on the Cash Box Top 100, while in Australia, it peaked at number eight, being certified gold by ARIA.

American entertainment company BuzzFeed ranked "Sweet Dreams" number 53 in their list of "The 101 Greatest Dance Songs Of the '90s" in 2017.

Background and recording
American singer Melanie Thornton began pursing her dream of being a singer while singing in a band called Danger Zone. After two years with the band, she was looking to move on. Her sister then urged Thornton to come overseas, where the sister's family had contacts in music business. Thornton arrived in Germany in 1992 with $15 in her pocket and found work with some small-time record producers who needed a vocalist for demo tracks. She then discovered she could make more money in studio sessions than performing live gigs.

Thornton came to German producer Frank Farian's attention just accidentally. She was working as a studio session vocalist, recording "Sweet Dreams", a song she had co-written. It was recorded as her fifth or sixth song, when Farian heard it. Thornton told in an interview, "I wasn't actually looking for a record deal. He (Farian) loved it and wanted to release it on his label." Farian liked the song but wanted a rapper to perform on it also. Thornton then suggested American rapper Lane McCray, which she had met three weeks earlier, while working with a cover band when he filled in as a replacement vocalist. McCray, a North Carolina native, was stationed in Germany while in the Air Force. Thornton told in the same interview, "He was still in the Air Force at the time, but he agreed to do it. The next thing you know we're released and shooting up the charts in Italy."

Composition
"Sweet Dreams" was co-written by La Bouche's Melanie Thornton with Robert Haynes and Mehmet Sönmez. It has a tempo of 134 beats per minute and is written in the key of B minor. The song follows a chord progression of Bm7GA, and the vocals span from A3 to B4.

The song's bridge samples American funk band Ripple's 1973 hit "I Don't Know What It Is, but It Sure Is Funky".

Chart performance
"Sweet Dreams" went on becoming a major hit on several continents. In Europe, it went to number-one in Italy in July 1994, as well as on the European Dance Radio Chart in September 1994. The song was also a top 10 hit in Austria (3), Germany (8), Spain (6), and Switzerland (5). And a top 20 hit in Finland (15), Iceland (15) and Ireland (16), and on the Eurochart Hot 100 (17). In the UK, the single had two runs on the UK Singles Chart, in 1994 and 1996. Its best position was as number 44 on September 1, 1996. Outside Europe, "Sweet Dreams" reached number three in Israel, number five in Japan, number eight in Australia and number 13 on the US Billboard Hot 100. But on the Billboard Hot Dance Club Play chart, the song hit number three, while on the US Cash Box Top 100, it reached number eight.

"Sweet Dreams" was awarded with a gold record in Australia, with a sale of 35,000 singles.

Critical reception
An editor from The Atlanta Journal-Constitution described "Sweet Dreams" as a "high-energy hit". Michael Saunders from Boston Globe declared the cut as a "glorious" and "effervescent". Gil L. Robertson IV from Cash Box named it a "standout track" of the Sweet Dreams album. Daily News of Los Angeless reviewer called it "energetic". Pan-European magazine Music & Media remarked that the added value of this "throbbing piece of Euro dance is Melanie Thornton's massive vocals, which definitely set the track apart from most of her competition." An editor, Maria Jimenez, described it as "a high energy track with a pumped up familiar German techno sound and a little club hysteria", adding that it is "a prime candidate for crossing over."

Alan Jones from Music Week declared it as "pulsating pop/hiNRG with some refreshing bursts of guitar" and "yet another Euro-invader that is sure to score here." On the 1996 UK re-release, he added that it's "throbbing, melodic Eurodance not too far removed from some of Snap!'s early work, it is hugely commercial. You have been warned." James Hamilton from the RM Dance Update deemed it a "routine Snap/Culture Beat-type (and Eurythmics influenced) Euro hit". People Magazine noted that the song "underscore buoyant vocals with dark minor-key arrangements". A reviewer from Richmond Times-Dispatch commented, "I am insanely jealous of the lead female vocal, Melanie Thornton. She has a wonderful, flexible voice."

Retrospective response
In 2017, American entertainment company BuzzFeed ranked "Sweet Dreams" number 53 in their list of "The 101 Greatest Dance Songs Of the '90s". Matt Stopera and Brian Galindo stated that "the "hola, hola, eh" makes this a multilingual smash!" James Arena, writer of Stars of '90s Dance Pop: 29 Hitmakers Discuss Their Careers said that the song and its follow-up, "Be My Lover" "are widely regarded today as indispensable classics of the decade."

Airplay
"Sweet Dreams" entered the European airplay chart Border Breakers at 19 on June 25, 1994, due to crossover airplay in South-Europe. It peaked at number five on September 3, 1994.

Music video
Two different music videos were made for "Sweet Dreams", one for the European market and one for the US. The US version was directed by Zack Ove and was released at the beginning of the year, in 1996 . The European music video was directed by Nigel Simpkiss and features Thornton and McCray performing the song in a surrounding of candlelights, candelabrums, red curtains, a bonfire and several dancers. Soap bubbles appears in the air. Some scenes shows Thornton singing while lying in an iron bed with bedding in leopard and cow print. Other scenes sees her sitting in a golden chair. Throughout the video, McCray performs dancing with the other dancers. Towards the end, the duo performs in front of a fountain. It was released on August 22 and A-listed on Germany's VIVA in October 1994. The video was later published by Vevo on YouTube in June 2016 and had generated more than 12 million views as of December 2022.

Track listings

 12" "Sweet Dreams (Ola Ola E)" (Club Mix) – 4:55
 "Sweet Dreams (Ola Ola E)" (House Mix) – 6:38
 "Sweet Dreams (Ola Ola E)" (Oriental Mix) – 5:17
 "Sweet Dreams (Ola Ola E)" (Hola Mix) – 5:10

 CD single "Sweet Dreams (Ola Ola E)" (Radio Version) – 3:23
 "Sweet Dreams (Ola Ola E)" (House Mix) – 6:38

 CD maxi "Sweet Dreams (Ola Ola E)" (Radio Version) – 3:23
 "Sweet Dreams (Ola Ola E)" (Club Mix) – 4:55
 "Sweet Dreams (Ola Ola E)" (House Mix) – 6:38
 "Sweet Dreams (Ola Ola E)" (Oriental Mix) – 5:17
 "Sweet Dreams (Ola Ola E)" (Hola Mix) – 5:10
		
 CD maxi - Remixes'
 "Sweet Dreams (Ola Ola E)" (Airplay Edit) – 3:58
 "Sweet Dreams (Ola Ola E)" (Loveland UK Mix) – 7:00
 "Sweet Dreams (Ola Ola E)" (Italian No.1 Mix) – 5:09
 "Sweet Dreams (Ola Ola E)" (French 'hit des clubs' Mix) – 5:35
 "Sweet Dreams (Ola Ola E)" (House Mix) – 6:38

Charts and certifications

Weekly charts

Original release (1994)

Re-release (1996)

Year-end charts

Certifications

References

External links

1994 debut singles
1994 songs
English-language German songs
La Bouche songs
Number-one singles in Italy
Song recordings produced by Frank Farian
Songs about dreams
Songs written by Melanie Thornton